Pathfinders (1972–1973, aka The Pathfinders) is an ITV drama set in the Second World War, telling the story of the fictitious Royal Air Force 192 Pathfinder squadron. The Pathfinders were specialised RAF squadrons that marked targets for the RAF's heavy bombers.

The series used radio controlled Avro Lancaster models for the flying scenes. The technical adviser for the series was Group Captain Hamish Mahaddie. The music was by Malcolm Lockyer.

Cast list
 Wing Commander MacPhearson – Robert Urquhart (13 episodes)
 Doc Saxon – Jack Watling (12 episodes)
 The Padre – Julian Orchard (4 episodes)
 Squadron Leader Shanks – Jack May (3 episodes)
 Flight Lieutenant Doug Phillips – Christopher Cazenove (2 episodes)

Episodes

In 2006, Simply Media released the series on DVD in the UK. Although sold as "The Complete Series" the release is actually missing Episode 8 "Our Daffodils Are Better Than Your Daffodils" without any explanation. The episode was also missing from the 2002 four-tape UK VHS release from DD Video. This episode was released in the US on VHS under the title "Assignment Top Secret".

References

External links
 
 CTVA archive Pathfinders

1970s British drama television series
1972 British television series debuts
1973 British television series endings
ITV television dramas
Aviation television series
Television series based on actual events
Television shows produced by Thames Television
English-language television shows
World War II television drama series
Royal Air Force mass media